Hariharan may refer to:

 Hariharan (singer) (born 1955), ghazal and playback singer from Mumbai
 Hariharan (director), Malayalam film director
 Githa Hariharan (born 1954), Indian author and editor
 Hariharan Srinivasan (1929–2015), Indian orthopedic surgeon
 K. Hariharan (disambiguation), several people
 Krishna Hariharan (born 1955), Indian Test cricket umpire
 Sruthi Hariharan (born 1989), Indian actress and model